Let's Dance 2006 was the first season of the Swedish celebrity dancing show Let's Dance, broadcast on TV4. The show was presented by David Hellenius and Agneta Sjödin. Winner of this season was singer Måns Zelmerlöw and 1-runner up was singer Anna Book.

Couples

Scoring chart

Red numbers couple thats got the lowest score from the jury of the week.
Green numbers couple that got the highest score from the jury of the week.
 the couple that was eliminated from the competition.
 the couple that received the lowest score of the week and was eliminated.
 the couple that got the lowest jury scory and televoting score.
 winning couple.
 second placing couple.

Average chart

Highest and lowest scoring performances 
The best and worst performances in each dance according to the judges' marks are as follows:

Dance schedule
The celebrities and professional partners danced one of these routines for each corresponding week.

Week 1: Cha-cha-cha or Waltz
Week 2: Rumba or Quickstep
Week 3: Jive or Tango
Week 4: Paso Doble or Foxtrot
Week 5: Samba
Week 6: Cha-cha-cha or Waltz
Week 7: Rumba or Quickstep
Week 8: Jive or Tango
Week 9: Paso Doble, Rumba, Cha-cha-cha, Quickstep or Foxtrot
Week 10: Finals – Tango, Paso Doble or Samba and Show Dance

Songs

Week 1 
Individual judges scores in the chart below (given in parentheses) are listed in this order from left to right: Maria, Dermot, Ann, Tony.
Running order

Week 2 
Individual judges scores in the chart below (given in parentheses) are listed in this order from left to right: Maria, Dermot, Ann, Tony.
Running order

Week 3 
Individual judges scores in the chart below (given in parentheses) are listed in this order from left to right: Maria, Dermot, Ann, Tony.
Running order

Week 4 
Individual judges scores in the chart below (given in parentheses) are listed in this order from left to right: Maria, Dermot, Ann, Tony.
Running order

Week 5 
Individual judges scores in the chart below (given in parentheses) are listed in this order from left to right: Maria, Dermot, Ann, Tony.
Running order

Week 6 
Individual judges scores in the chart below (given in parentheses) are listed in this order from left to right: Maria, Dermot, Ann, Tony.
Running order

Week 7 
Individual judges scores in the chart below (given in parentheses) are listed in this order from left to right: Maria, Dermot, Ann, Tony.
Running order

Week 8 
Individual judges scores in the chart below (given in parentheses) are listed in this order from left to right: Maria, Dermot, Ann, Tony.
Running order

Week 9 
Running order

Week 10
Running order

References

2006
2006 Swedish television seasons
TV4 (Sweden) original programming